Ahmad Ali Butt is a Pakistani actor, television host, comedian, keyboardist, rapper, singer, and songwriter.

Career
Butt began his career in music, where he was a member of the alternative rock band Entity Paradigm (EP) as a vocalist and rapper. He has also appeared in the sitcoms Jutt and Bond, Rubber Band and Inspector Khoji. He has also pursued a career as a comedian.

Personal life
Ahmad Ali Butt was born into a Punjabi family of Kashmiri ancestry. He is a maternal grandson of the Azamgarh-born film director Shaukat Hussain Rizvi and actress and playback singer Noor Jehan, and son of the late singer Zil-e-Huma. His father, Aqeel Butt, was a jeweler. Ahmad has three brothers.

Butt is married to model Faatima Khan. They had a son, Azaan, in 2014.

Filmography

Television

Accolades

References

Living people
Male actors from Lahore
Muhajir people
Pakistani male actors
Pakistani male comedians
Pakistani male singer-songwriters
Pakistani people of Kashmiri descent
Pakistani rappers
Pakistani television hosts
Pakistani voice actors
Punjabi people
Year of birth missing (living people)
Pakistani rock keyboardists
Pakistani keyboardists
Actors from Lahore
Singers from Lahore
Pakistani film actors
Actors in Urdu cinema
21st-century Pakistani actors
21st-century Pakistani singers
People from Lahore